John R. Phythyon Jr. is a game designer who has worked primarily on role-playing games.

Career
Phythyon ran a small-press role-playing game publishing company, Event Horizon Productions. Phythyon was brought on as a partner and Guardians of Order's Sales & Marketing Director in 2000. As part of this deal, Guardians also acquired Event Horizon Productions and games including Phythyon's own Heaven and Earth. Phythyon quickly pushed Guardians in a new direction: towards non-anime RPGs. The first of these was Ghost Dog (2000), a gangster Samurai Tri-stat game by David L. Pulver and Phythyon that was based on the film of the same name.

References

External links
 Home page
 

Living people
Role-playing game designers
Year of birth missing (living people)